Trevor Hirth (born 29 February 1984) is an Australian Paralympic table tennis player. He represented Australia at the 2020 Tokyo Paralympics.

Personal 
Hirth was born on 29 February 1984. He has lived with a neuro-muscular disability since birth.  His right leg is two centimeters shorter than his left, and his disability affects his power and strength and weakens his grip on the bat. In 2021, he lives in Avondale Heights, Victoria. He works as a Disability Awareness Educator and Smash Down Barriers Technical Expert.

Table tennis 
He is classified as a C6 Para-table tennis player. Hirth was introduced to table tennis as a child, playing on a makeshift table his grandfather had built and set up in the carport of his family home. He was  29-years-old when he was spotted by an ex-Paralympic table tennis player at his local club and was told that he should try out for the Australian team.

He has won the Australian Championships in his class six times.

Hirth has won ten international medals, including gold at the 2013 and 2017 Oceania Para Table Tennis Championships. He has competed at three World Championships - 2014, 2017 and 2018.

Since 2018 he has been an International Table Tennis Federation Athletes' Commission Member.

At the 2020 Tokyo Paralympics, he lost two matches in the Men's Individual C6 and with Jake Ballestrino lost in the quarter-finals of Men's Team C6-7.

References

External links 
 

1984 births
Living people
Paralympic table tennis players of Australia
Table tennis players at the 2020 Summer Paralympics
Sportsmen from Victoria (Australia)
Sportspeople from Melbourne
People from the City of Moonee Valley